Langdell Hall is the largest building of Harvard Law School in Cambridge, Massachusetts. It is home to the school's library, the largest academic law library in the world, named after pioneering law school dean Christopher C. Langdell. It is built in a modified neoclassical style.

The building was commissioned in 1905 by law school dean James Barr Ames, as the school was outgrowing H.H. Richardson's Austin Hall. It was designed by Richardson's successor, the firm Shepley, Rutan and Coolidge. The southern wing of the current building was completed and occupied by 1907. The same firm, rechristened Coolidge, Shepley, Bulfinch and Abbott, completed the northern and western wings in 1929.

In 1959, the International Legal Studies building, now the Lewis International Law Center, was constructed to house approximately 300,000 volumes in open-stacks.

In 1997, Coolidge, Shepley, Bulfinch and Abbott was appointed once again, this time to renovate the building. The renovations expanded the library, which now takes up most of the building, with the exception of two classrooms- the Vorenberg and Kirkland & Ellis. The renovation also included the installation of air conditioning and additional women's restrooms.

Other notable parts of the building include the Caspersen Room, named for HLS alumnus Finn M. W. Caspersen (J.D. 1966). The Caspersen Room, formerly called the Treasure Room, once housed part of the library's collection of rare books and manuscripts. The lobby of the building is graced by a statue of Joseph Story, Harvard professor and Supreme Court justice, sculpted by his son, William Wetmore Story.

External links

History of the Harvard Law School Library
HLS Walking Tour: Langdell Hall

About Historical & Special Collections: The Elihu Root Room & Caspersen Room

Harvard Law School
School buildings completed in 1907
1907 establishments in Massachusetts
Law libraries in the United States
Harvard Library